Emmanuelle Mouké (born December 3, 1984) is an Ivorian female professional basketball player.

External links
Equipe nationale de Basket

1984 births
Living people
Ivorian women's basketball players